The Shaitthaung Temple (Rakhine and ,), also spelled Shitthaung (Okell: Hyiʔthaùñ hpăyà ) according to Standard Burmese pronunciation, is a famous Buddhist temple in Mrauk U. The name means 'Temple of 80,000 Buddha Images', and is also known as the 'Temple of Victory'.

History

The temple was built in 1535–1536 by King Min Bin to commemorate his conquest of Bengal. It is located on the western face of Pokhaung Hill, north of the Royal Palace, and adjacent to the Andaw-thein Temple. It is typical of the many Buddhist temples found in Burma: a central bell-shaped stupa, surrounded by four smaller stupas at the corners, and a multitude of even-smaller stupas surrounding them. At the east of the temple, there is a recent (though about 75 years old) addition of a flight of stairs and tazaung.

There is a central hall at the heart of the temple, which can be easily accessed. Hundreds of Buddha statues line the main hall, some of them in their original positions, others moved from nearby excavation sites. However, the Shitthaung's most prominent feature is not the central hall, but rather the three layers of maze-like corridors that encircle the main hall. The three corridors contain countless reliefs of Buddhas, Bodhisattvas, Kings of Spiritual abodes, Devas, guardian spirits, the 550 Jatakas, Arakanese culture and animals, both real and mythical.

The Shite-thaung temple is the main attraction of Mrauk U. Adjacent to it lies another famous temple, the Htukkanthein Temple (Htukkan Ordination Hall).

Weather damage 
Due to Mrauk U's tropical location, much of its temples have been damaged by the monsoon rain. It was discovered in 2003 that the central stupa had begun to leak, dissolving away some of the intricate statues in the two chambers. To prevent this, the local archaeological department hastily poured concrete over the stupas. This prevented the statues inside from being destroyed, but it also destroyed the outer appearance of the temple, which was the focal pagoda to most of the northern Arakanese.

Many Arakanese criticize "the defacing" of their most treasured temple, but since it was the only way to protect the more precious carvings inside, the actions have not been as widely condemned as expected.

Gallery

See also
Htukkanthein Temple
Koe-thaung Temple
 Andaw-thein Ordination Hall
 Le-myet-hna Temple
 Ratanabon Pagoda

References

Bibliography

External links

Buddhist temples in Rakhine State
Tourist attractions in Myanmar
Buddhist pilgrimage sites in Myanmar
16th-century Buddhist temples
1535 establishments in Asia
16th-century establishments in the Mrauk-U Kingdom
Religious buildings and structures completed in 1535